Mangla (منگلا) is a town situated in District Mirpur within the region of Azad Kashmir. The village is located in the west of the foothills of Mangla's fort (which also derived its name from the same village). It is surrounded on three sides by the semicurvature of river Jhelum flowing North to South. It is bordered with Jhelum district and with the right bank of Mangla between the State of Jammu Kashmir and Punjab province of Pakistan.

Etymology
The town of Mangla was named after Mangla Devi, Khokhar Rajput tribe lady. Mangla Devi was the daughter of Khokhar Kshatriya Raja Porus. It has been narrated to be the site of the crossing of the Jhelum river by the forces of Alexander the Great facing King Porus.

History
At the time of construction of the Mangla Dam, the villages of Sultanpure, Thill, Baral and Baruti across the river in Jhelum District were developed as residential colonies and offices for foreign workers and officials.

Prior to the construction of Mangla Dam, in March 1962, almost all the inhabitants of the ancient Mangla village moved to Mangla Hamlet, therefore this town represents Mangla in a true sense. The dam reservoir has a perimeter of 400 km, and is a place of interest. It hosts the Mangla Power Station, which is the second largest in Pakistan.

Mangla Fort
Mangla is the site of the historic Mangla Fort. The fort is situated on a high hill overlooking the Jhelum river, dividing the Mirpur and Jhelum districts. A part of Mangla fort was razed during the construction of the Mangla Dam, however, a large part remains and serves as a public recreation place.

Mangla Cantonment

After the completion of Mangla Dam, most of the Baral and Sultanpure Thill area was taken over by the Pakistan Army and converted into a Cantonment whereas a small section within the compound walls of Pakistan Army's officers residences, known as Baral Colony, was allotted to WAPDA named as WAPDA Officers Colony.

References

External links
 More information about mangla
 Guide to Kashmir

Populated places in Mirpur District